The A95 road is a major road of north-east Scotland connecting the A9 road in the Highlands to the A98 road near the coast.

Route
It leaves the A9 four miles north of Aviemore.

It then goes:
through Drumullie;
near to Dulnain Bridge – junction with A938 road;
through Craggan
near to Grantown-on-Spey  – junctions with A939 road;
through Cromdale
through Mains of Dalvey;
over the Bridge of Avon;
through Aberlour;
through Craigellachie – junctions with A941 road;
through Maggieknockater, Mulben, Tauchers and Rosarie;
joins the A96 road west of Keith leaving it east of that town;
through Farmtown, Drumnagarroch, Glenbarry, Gordonstown and Cornhill

It ends with a junction with the A98 road between Portsoy and Banff.

References

Roads in Scotland
Transport in Aberdeenshire
Transport in Highland (council area)
Transport in Moray